Hadiza Sabuwa Balarabe is a Nigerian politician and medical doctor who is the deputy governor of Kaduna State since 2019. She is the first female deputy governor of the state and was elected during the 2019 Nigerian gubernatorial elections held in March, under the platform of the ruling party, APC.

On 15 October 2019, as Acting Governor, she presented the Kaduna State Government's 2020 Budget of Renewal to the Kaduna State House of Assembly, thereby becoming the first woman to do so in Northern Nigeria.

In 2022, she nursed the ambition of contesting for the position of governor during the 2023 general election but withdrew and was picked as a running mate to the APC consensus candidate, Senator Uba Sani.

In March 2023, she was re-elected deputy governor.

Biography 
Balarabe was born into the family of Alhaji Abubakar Balarabe in Sanga local government area of Kaduna state, She attended Girls College Soba for her secondary education, she then got admission into the prestigious University of Maiduguri to study medicine and graduated with MBBS in 1986.

References

Governors of Kaduna State
Women state governors of Nigeria
Living people
Year of birth missing (living people)
University of Maiduguri alumni
Nigerian women medical doctors
21st-century Nigerian medical doctors
Nigerian women in politics